Kurdistan Region–Sweden relations are bilateral relations between Kurdistan Region and Sweden. Kurdistan Region is represented in Sweden through a representation in Stockholm since 2011, while Sweden has an embassy in Erbil since 2012.

Trade between the two parties amounted 154 million dollars in 2012. There were 56 registered Swedish companies registered in Kurdistan Region that year. Swedish MP Fredrik Malm stated that "We are friends of the Kurdish people and we follow the events closely, and our key objective is to support the self-determination of the Kurdish people."

Swedish Foreign Minister Margot Wallström met Kurdish Foreign Minister Falah Mustafa in January 2015 and discussed humanitarian aid for the internally displaced people in the region. In November same year, Wallström and Swedish Defense Minister Peter Hultqvist travelled to Erbil and pledged support for Kurdish forces fighting ISIS. 70 Swedish soldiers have been sent to Erbil to train Kurdish soldiers in urban warfare, healthcare, and protection against chemical weapons. In October 2016, Swedish Prime Minister Stefan Löfven visited Erbil, where he met Kurdish President Masoud Barzani, Prime Minister Nechirvan Barzani and the stationed Swedish soldiers.

See also 
Foreign relations of Kurdistan Region
Foreign relations of Sweden

References

Sweden
Bilateral relations of Sweden